The 2003 NCAA Division I women's soccer tournament (also known as the 2003 Women's College Cup) was the 22nd annual single-elimination tournament to determine the national champion of NCAA Division I women's collegiate soccer. The semifinals and championship game were played at SAS Soccer Park in Cary, North Carolina from December 5–7, 2003. 

Top seeded North Carolina defeated unranked Connecticut in the final, 6–0, to win their seventeenth national title. The undefeated Tar Heels (27–0) were coached by Anson Dorrance. The Tar Heels dominated their competition on their way to the championship, winning all six of their games by a combined score of 32–0.

The most outstanding offensive player was Heather O'Reilly from North Carolina, and the most outstanding defensive player was Catherine Reddick, also from North Carolina. O'Reilly and Reddick, along with nine other players, were named to the All-Tournament team. O'Reilly was also the tournament's leading scorer, with 8 goals.  The championship referee was Brian Kirkley from Atlanta, GA.

Qualification

All Division I women's soccer programs were eligible to qualify for the tournament. The tournament field remained fixed at 64 teams.

Format
Just as before, the final two rounds, deemed the Women's College Cup, were played at a pre-determined neutral site. All other rounds were played on campus sites at the home field of the higher-seeded team. The only exceptions were the first two rounds, which were played at regional campus sites. The top sixteen teams, all of which were seeded for the first time ever, hosted four team-regionals on their home fields during the tournament's first weekend.

Records

Bracket

North Carolina Bracket

UCLA Bracket

Florida Bracket

Notre Dame Bracket

College Cup

All-tournament team
Lori Chalupny, North Carolina
Jessica Giertsen, Connecticut
Kristen Graczyk, Connecticut
Heather O'Reilly, North Carolina (most outstanding offensive player)
Nandi Price, UCLA
Alyssa Ramsey, North Carolina
Catherine Reddick, Portland (most outstanding defensive player)
Lindsay Tarpley, North Carolina
Maggie Tomecka, North Carolina
India Trotter, Florida State
Carmen Watley, North Carolina

See also 
 NCAA Women's Soccer Championships (Division II, Division III)
 NCAA Men's Soccer Championships (Division I, Division II, Division III)

References

NCAA
NCAA Women's Soccer Championship
 
NCAA Division I Women's Soccer Tournament
NCAA Division I Women's Soccer Tournament
NCAA Division I Women's Soccer Tournament